Robert Regis (born 24 January 1967) is an English former professional footballer who played as a striker. He played four games in the Football League for Burnley, scoring one goal.

References
Burnley Post-War players' stats

1967 births
Living people
Footballers from Huddersfield
English footballers
Association football forwards
Huddersfield Town A.F.C. players
Burnley F.C. players
English Football League players
Colne Dynamoes F.C. players